Joaquín Jovellar y Soler (28 December 1819 – 17 April 1892) was a Spanish general who served as the Prime Minister of Spain from 12 September 1875 to 2 December 1875 and governor and captain-general of the Philippines from 7 April 1883 to 1 April 1885.

Jovellar was born in Palma de Mallorca. After his studies at military academy he was appointed sub-lieutenant, went to Cuba as captain in 1842. He returned to the War Office in 1851, was promoted major in 1853, and went to Morocco as private secretary to O'Donnell, who made him colonel in 1860, after Jovellar had been wounded at the battle of Wadel Ras.

In 1863 Jovellar became a brigadier-general and the following year he was appointed under-secretary for war. Despite being severely wounded in fighting insurgents on the streets of Madrid, he rose to the rank of general of division in 1866. Jovellar adhered to the revolution, and Amadeo made him a lieutenant-general in 1872. In the autumn of 1873, Castelar sent him to Cuba as governor-general which he served from November 1873 – 1874 and June 1876–October 1878. In 1874 Jovellar came back to the Peninsula, and afterwards and was in command of the Army of the Center against the Carlists when Arsenio Martínez Campos went to Sagunto to proclaim Alfonso XII. Alfonso XII made him a captain-general, president of the council, life-senator, and governor-general of the Philippines (1883–1885). Jovellar died in Madrid on 17 April 1892.

References

 Governors of the Philippines during the Spanish colonial period
 Philippines
Antonio Cánovas del Castillo

1819 births
1892 deaths
People from Palma de Mallorca
Prime Ministers of Spain
Spanish captain generals
Spanish generals
Conservative Party (Spain) politicians
Captains General of the Philippines
Spanish military personnel of the Third Carlist War (Governmental faction)